Shlomo Zalman Shragai (1899–1995) was an Israeli politician and Jerusalem's first elected mayor.

Shragai was born into a Polish Orthodox Jewish family in Gorzkowice in 1899. He then became active in the religious Zionist movement and settled in Palestine in 1924, already playing an important political role before Israel's founding in 1948.

In 1950, Shragai was elected mayor of West Jerusalem, a position he held for two years.  He then became the head of immigration of the Jewish Agency for Palestine. This was a time of extensive immigration to Israel from Muslim countries, so he often went on clandestine trips to these countries to obtain the release of the Jews living there. He served as honorary world president of Hapoel HaMizrachi movement.

References

External links 
 "Shlomo Zalman Schragai, Former Jerusalem Mayor, 96" in New York Times, September 4, 1995. Retrieved October 15, 2006.

Members of the Assembly of Representatives (Mandatory Palestine)
Mayors of Jerusalem
Israeli Orthodox Jews
Polish Orthodox Jews
Polish emigrants to Mandatory Palestine
People from Piotrków County
People from Piotrków Governorate
Jews from the Russian Empire
1899 births
1995 deaths
Heads of the Jewish Agency for Israel